Charles Henri Marie "Kik" Thole (born 5 February 1944) is a retired field hockey player from the Netherlands. He competed at the 1968 and 1972 Olympics, where his teams finished in fifth and fourth place, respectively.

Between 1966 and 1972 Thole played 54 international matches and scored 7 goals.

References

External links
 

1944 births
Living people
Dutch male field hockey players
Field hockey players at the 1968 Summer Olympics
Field hockey players at the 1972 Summer Olympics
Olympic field hockey players of the Netherlands
People from Bussum
Sportspeople from North Holland